Saint Hoax is a pseudonymous Syrian artist, satirist and socio-political activist. They use various mediums to subversively depict political and popular figures. They're also known for taking Disney characters out of context and using them for social awareness.

Career

Social awareness

Happy Never After 

In 2014, Saint Hoax published their campaign Happy Never After. The artist used images of Disney princesses to spread awareness about domestic violence. The princesses were illustrated with bruises on their faces and a slogan that read "When did he stop treating you like a princess?" accompanied the visuals. Hours after the posters were published on the artist's website, the campaign went viral. Happy Never After became one of the most shared domestic violence campaign. In November 2014, it was used as the official anti-domestic violence campaign in Amsterdam.

Social media 
Saint Hoax uses social media, particularly Instagram, as their main platform. They’re mostly known for posting edited videos and images that satirize political and pop cultural figures. They covered the 2021 Met Gala as a "Meme Correspondent."

Exhibitions

Solo exhibitions 
 2018: "MonuMental", Plastik Gallery, Beirut 
 2016: "Is That All There Is ", Guy Hepner, New York 
 2015: "POPlitically Incorrect", The Adler Subhashok Gallery, Bangkok

Group exhibitions 
 2015: Art Palm Beach, The Adler Subhashok Gallery, Florida
 2014: Singapore Art Fair, The Adler Subhashok Gallery, Singapore
 2014: Beirut Art Fair, Plastik Gallery, Beirut

References

External links 
 Official website

Syrian artists
Pseudonymous artists
Year of birth missing (living people)
Living people